AutoKey is a free, open-source scripting application for Linux.

AutoKey allows the user to define hotkeys and trigger phrases which expand to predefined text, automating frequent or repetitive tasks such as correcting typographical errors or common spelling mistakes and inserting boiler plate sections of text.

Hotkeys, and trigger phrases may also be configured to run scripts which use the full power of Python 3 to perform actions which can generate window, keyboard, and mouse events using the provided AutoKey API.

Most applications will respond to these events as if the user were actually typing on the keyboard and using the mouse. This allows AutoKey scripts to cause these applications to perform almost any sequence of actions a user could manually make them do - at the press of a single hotkey. 

Since AutoKey scripts are written in full Python, they can also interact with the whole system to perform tasks which would be difficult for a user to do manually such as reading and writing files, retrieving system status information, or performing calculations and making decisions.

It also provides simple dialog management tools so scripts can present information and interact with the user.

History 

In 2008, Chris Dekter wrote the original version of AutoKey in Python 2 for the Linux operating system. On , Guoci released the first Python 3 version.

Phrase expansion was inspired by the commercial Windows software 'PhraseExpress'.

AutoKey is currently available in packaged form for users of Debian, Arch, Gentoo, and Fedora as well as for some of their derivative distributions such as Ubuntu, Mint, and Manjaro.

The software is licensed under GNU General Public License (GPLv3).

See also 

 AutoHotkey (for Windows only)
 AutoIt (for Windows only)
 Automator (for Macintosh only)
 Bookmarklet
 iMacros for Firefox
 Xnee, a program that can be used to record and replay test.
 SikuliX

References

External links

 Linux Journal Review 
 Python 3 AutoKey on GitHub
 AutoKey wiki on GitHub
 AutoKey current version in .deb packaging
 AutoKey Support Forum
 Article in Linux Uprising
 Article on makeiteasier.com 

Automation software
Free system software
Free software programmed in Python